The eyebrowed wren-babbler (Napothera epilepidota) is a species of bird in the family Pellorneidae.
It is found in Bhutan, China, India, Indonesia, Laos, Malaysia, Myanmar, Thailand, and Vietnam.
Its natural habitats are subtropical or tropical moist lowland forest and subtropical or tropical moist montane forest.

References

Collar, N. J. & Robson, C. 2007. Family Timaliidae (Babblers)  pp. 70 – 291 in; del Hoyo, J., Elliott, A. & Christie, D.A. eds. Handbook of the Birds of the World, Vol. 12. Picathartes to Tits and Chickadees. Lynx Edicions, Barcelona.

eyebrowed wren-babbler
Birds of Bhutan
Birds of Northeast India
Birds of South China
Birds of Hainan
Birds of Southeast Asia
eyebrowed wren-babbler
Taxonomy articles created by Polbot